Pseudolatirus discrepans is a species of sea snail, a marine gastropod mollusk in the family Fasciolariidae, the spindle snails, the tulip snails and their allies.

Description
The shell size varies between 40 mm and 80 mm

Distribution
This species is found in the seas along the Philippines and South West Japan.

References

External links
 

Fasciolariidae
Gastropods described in 1961